Salami Oluwasesan Abbas (born 26 November 1988), better known by his stage name Sess, or Sess The PRBLM Kid, is a Nigerian singer, songwriter, and music producer. He is known for solely producing Falz The Bahd Guy and Simi's joint EP, Chemistry.

He is notable with the mainstream sound watermark, "Sess, The Problem Kid", on his produced instrumentals.

Early life and education

Salami Oluwasesan Abbas is from Offa, a town in the state of Kwara. He was born into a family of four children in Sagamu, Ogun State before moving to Ilorin, Kwara State.

Sess attended the University of Ilorin Staff School for elementary education before moving on to Best Legacy International High School then Thomas Adewunmi International college for secondary school. He then went on to study Law at University of Ilorin, and was called to the Nigerian Bar in 2012.

Career

He primarily produced Falz's second studio album Stories That Touch, and the entirety of the collaborative EP Chemistry by Falz and Simi.

In 2016, Sess was nominated for African Producer of the Year at Soundcity MVP Awards Festival.

In 2016, Stories That Touch won Album of the Year at the City People Entertainment Awards. In the same year, he won the New Discovery Producer of the Year and Afro Hip Hop Producer of the Year awards at The Beatz Awards 2016.

In 2018, he primarily produced the album Moral Instruction by Falz.

Discography

Production

Album
Omo Murda 
Spotlight (EP)
PRBLM (Mixtape)

Singles
Sess - Original Gangster' feat. Adekunle Gold and Reminisce 
Don't Worry - Sess & Spax 
To Match - Sess & Teni
Revival - Sess

Awards and nominations

References

Living people
1988 births
Nigerian singer-songwriters
Nigerian male singer-songwriters
Nigerian record producers
People from Sagamu
Nigerian male pop singers
Nigerian hip hop singers